Carpenter Run is a stream in the U.S. state of West Virginia.

The creek has the name of Nicholas Carpenter who was ambushed by Indians near the site in 1791.

See also
List of rivers of West Virginia

References

Rivers of Wood County, West Virginia
Rivers of West Virginia